Bay State was a brand name used by John C. Haynes & Co., Boston, MA for their better grades of guitars, banjos and mandolins from circa 1861. John Haynes & Co. also marketed guitars under the William B. Tilton and Haynes Excelsior brand names before 1900.

See also 
 Oliver Ditson

References

Citations 
(1) http://www.mugwumps.com/wrenches.html - a catalog of banjo wrenches, compiled by Michael I. Holmes
(2) http://www.billsbanjos.com/Baystate317.htm - documentation of a Banjo made circa 1890 by the John C. Haynes & Co.

Guitars
1861 establishments in Massachusetts